Addis Alem is the name of several towns in Ethiopia:

Addis Alem, Shewa (also known as Ejersa), the largest and best known, located in the Oromia Region
Addis Alem, Agew Awi, located in the southwestern Amhara Region
Addis Alem, Gojjam, located in the southern Amhara Region
 Addis Alem, one of the neighborhoods of Gondar